Penrice is a village and community in Swansea county, Wales on the Gower peninsula. It had a population of 451 as of the 2011 UK census and includes the villages of Oxwich and Horton. Penrice has an elected community council.

Penrice Castle is nearby as is St Andrew's Church, Penrice.

See also
List of villages in Gower

References

Populated places on the Gower Peninsula
Villages in Swansea
Communities in Swansea